Elina Pienimäki-Hietamäki (born 20 July 1976) is a Finnish cross-country skier. She competed at the 2002 Winter Olympics and the 2006 Winter Olympics.

Cross-country skiing results
All results are sourced from the International Ski Federation (FIS).

Olympic Games

World Championships

a.  Cancelled due to extremely cold weather.

World Cup

Season standings

Individual podiums
2 podiums – (2 )

Team podiums
2 podiums – (1 , 1 )

References

External links
 

1976 births
Living people
Finnish female cross-country skiers
Olympic cross-country skiers of Finland
Cross-country skiers at the 2002 Winter Olympics
Cross-country skiers at the 2006 Winter Olympics
Sportspeople from Oulu
21st-century Finnish women